This is a list of unguided rockets and missiles used for military purposes.

List

See also
List of missiles

References

Rocket weapons
Lists of rockets
Lists of weapons
Missile types